Gordon Millington (4 May 1848 – 27 April 1923) was a New Zealand cricketer. He played two first-class matches for Otago between 1876 and 1881.

A fast bowler, Millington took 3 for 57 and 6 for 37 when Otago lost to Canterbury in 1876-77. A few weeks later he was Otago's most successful bowler against the touring English team, taking 6 for 54 off 45.3 four-ball overs in an innings defeat. In 1878 he was one of the best New Zealand bowlers in the matches against the touring Australians, taking 5 for 44 to help give Otago a first-innings lead in the drawn match. "The Australians failed against Millington, who again proved himself Otago's mainstay," wrote the New Zealand cricket historian Tom Reese.

Millington captained the Oamaru team against the next Australian touring team in 1880-81, taking 4 for 34 off 36.2 four-ball overs. He also captained Oamaru against the Auckland team that was making its first tour of the South Island in 1882-83; he took 7 for 81 in Auckland's only innings.

In the 1880s Millington farmed with his brother John, who also played cricket for Oamaru, at Papakaio in North Otago. He spent most of the rest of his life in Oamaru working as a woolclasser.

See also
 List of Otago representative cricketers

References

External links
 

1848 births
1923 deaths
New Zealand cricketers
Otago cricketers
Sportspeople from Rugby, Warwickshire